Joy Augustus Go Young is a Filipino politician currently serving as a member of the City Council representing Cebu City's North District. He served as Vice Mayor of Cebu City from 2010 to 2013 and was a member of the Philippine House of Representatives for PROMDI from 1998 to 2001.

Young also served as a consultant on education under Cebu City Mayor Tomas Osmeña.

References

|-

Living people
People from Cebu City
Cebuano people
Vice Mayors of Cebu City
Cebu City Council members
Year of birth missing (living people)
Party-list members of the House of Representatives of the Philippines